Emily Louise Orr Elliott (July 22, 1867 – February 27, 1952) was a Canadian artist and fashion illustrator.

She was born Emily Louise Orr in Montreal and studied at the Ontario School of Art in Toronto, the Art Students League of New York and the New York School of Design. Besides her oil paintings of figures, landscapes and flowers, she also provided sketches for the Eaton's and Simpson's catalogues and illustrated fashion designs for newspapers and magazines. Elliott also wrote a column on boats and boating for the Toronto Star, composed songs and lectured on art.

Her work was exhibited at the Royal Canadian Academy, the Ontario Society of Artists, the Women's Art Association of Canada and the Canadian National Exhibition. She was founding chair of the Women's Committee of the Canadian National Exhibition. Her work is on display in Victoria College, Emmanuel College, St. Hilda's College, the Queen Elizabeth Hospital and the Toronto Women's Press Club.

In 1893, she married John Ephraim Elliott; the couple had one son.

She died in Toronto at the age of 84.

Her work is held in the collections of the City of Toronto Market Gallery and the Toronto Public Library.

Her collection of art published by other illustrators was donated to the Art Gallery of Ontario.

References 

1867 births
1952 deaths
Art Students League of New York alumni
Artists from Montreal
Canadian women painters
Fashion illustrators
OCAD University alumni
Toronto Star people
19th-century American women artists
19th-century Canadian women artists
20th-century American women artists
20th-century Canadian women artists